The Fresno County Courthouse is an 8-story,  low-rise building at 1100 Van Ness Avenue in downtown Fresno, California that serves as the main location for the Fresno County Superior Court. 

Construction was completed on the building was in 1966 on the site of–and replacing–the previous neo-classical style courthouse that was completed in 1875. Architectural historian David Gebhardt said of the loss of the old courthouse to the current one, "insipid." 

The courthouse is connected to the Fresno County Jail underground through a system of tunnels providing easy and safe transportation of inmates.

A $113 million seismic retrofit was scheduled to be completed in 2015.

Gallery

References

External links
 The Superior Court of California, County of Fresno official website

Government buildings completed in 1966
Buildings and structures in Fresno, California
County courthouses in California